Audrey Auld-Mezera (née Audrey Auld; 14 January 1964 – 9 August 2015) was an Australian American country music touring singer–songwriter. She had released eleven albums and three EPs on her own Reckless Records label, and had recorded with numerous musicians including Bill Chambers, Kieran Kane, Fred Eaglesmith, Mary Gauthier, Dale Watson, Kasey Chambers, and Carrie Rodriguez. She had songs recorded by various artists and songs placed on the FX TV shows "Justified", "Longmire", "NCIS: New Orleans" and "The Good Guys". She hosted songwriting workshops with inmates in San Quentin Prison in California from 2007 till 2013.

Auld-Mezera died of cancer on 9 August 2015, aged 51.

Discography

Studio albums

Compilation albums

Live albums

Extended plays

Awards and nominations

ARIA Music Awards
The ARIA Music Awards are a set of annual ceremonies presented by Australian Recording Industry Association (ARIA), which recognise excellence, innovation, and achievement across all genres of the music of Australia. They commenced in 1987.

|-
| 2001 || The Fallen || Best Country Album ||  
|-
| 2005 || Texas || Best Country Album ||  
|-

References

External links
 Official website

Australian country singer-songwriters
Australian women singer-songwriters
Australian women guitarists
1964 births
2015 deaths